This is a list of Brazilian television related events from 2006.

Events
26 March - Malhação actress Juliana Didone and her partner Leandro Azevedo win the second season of Dança dos Famosos.
28 March - Mara Viana wins the sixth season of Big Brother Brasil.
5 April - The Brazilian version of Pop Idol debuts on SBT.
27 July - Leandro Lopes wins the first season of Ídolos.
6 August - Former Olympic athlete Robson Caetano and his partner Ivonete Liberatto win the third season of Dança dos Famosos.

Debuts
5 April - Ídolos (2006-2012)

Television shows

1970s
Turma da Mônica (1976–present)

1990s
Malhação (1995–present)
Cocoricó (1996–present)

2000s
Sítio do Picapau Amarelo (2001–2007)
Big Brother Brasil (2002–present)
Dança dos Famosos (2005–present)

Ending this year

Births

Deaths

See also
2006 in Brazil
List of Brazilian films of 2006